Jean Vautrin (17 May 1933 – 16 June 2015), real name Jean Herman, was a French writer, filmmaker and film critic.

Life and career
After studying literature at Auxerre, he took first place in the Id'HEC competition. He studied French literature at the University of Bombay; he became assistant director to Roberto Rossellini. Back in France, he produced five feature films.

He became famous among the general public in 1989, winning the Prix Goncourt for his novel Un grand pas vers le bon Dieu.

His novel ‘Le Cri du Peuple’ was adapted as a graphic novel by Jacques Tardi.

Filmography

Assistant director
 India, Terre Mère
 Paris nous appartient
 Les Quatre Cavaliers de l'Apocalypse
 Le Jour le plus long

Director
 1958 Voyage en Boscavie (co-directed by Claude Choublier) (short)
 1960 Actua-Tilt  (short)
 1961 La Quille  (short)
 1962 Twist Parade (short)
 1962 Le Chemin de la mauvaise route (short)
 1963 Les Fusils (short)
 1964 La Cinémathèque Française (short)
 1967 Le Dimanche de la vie 
 1968 Adieu l'ami 
 1969 Jeff 
 1969 Decameron 69 (co-directed by Bernard Clarens, Jean Desvilles, Louis Grospierre, Miklós Jancsó, Serge Korber and François Reichenbach) 
 1971 Popsy Pop 
 1972 L'Œuf
 1974 Graf Yoster, 2 episodes : Der Papageienkäfig and Das Spiel mit dem Tode (TV series)
 1975 Les Grands Détectives, 2 episodes : Un rendez-vous dans les ténèbres and Monsieur Lecoq (TV series)
 1975 Les Peupliers de la Prétentaine (TV series)

Screenwriter
 1958 Voyage en Boscavie directed by Jean Herman and Claude Choublier (short)
 1960 Actua-Tilt directed by Jean Herman  (short)
 1961 La Quille directed by Jean Herman  (short)
 1962 Twist Parade directed by Jean Herman   (short)
 1962 Le Chemin de la mauvaise route directed by Jean Herman (short)
 1964 La Cinémathèque Française directed by Jean Herman (short)
 1968 Adieu l'ami directed by Jean Herman   
 1971 Popsy Pop directed by Jean Herman   
 1972 L'Œuf directed by Jean Herman   
 1976 Le Grand Escogriffe directed by Claude Pinoteau
 1977 Banlieue sud-est directed by Gilles Grangier (TV series)
 1979 Histoires insolites (1 episode Le locataire d'en haut directed by Gilles Grangier) (TV series)
 1979 Les Insulaires directed by Gilles Grangier (TV movie)
 1979 Miss directed by Roger Pigaut (TV series)
 1979 Flic ou Voyou directed by Georges Lautner 
 1980 Le Guignolo directed by Georges Lautner 
 1980 L'Entourloupe directed by Gérard Pirès 
 1980 Jean-Sans-Terre directed by Gilles Grangier (TV movie)
 1981 Garde à vue directed by Claude Miller 
 1983 Le Marginal directed by Jacques Deray 
 1984 Rue barbare directed by Gilles Béhat 
 1984 Canicule directed by Yves Boisset 
 1985 Intrigues directed by Maurice Dugowson (TV series)
 1985 Urgence directed by Gilles Béhat 
 1986 Bleu comme l'enfer directed by Yves Boisset 
 1987 Charlie Dingo directed by Gilles Béhat
 1991 Berlin Lady directed by Pierre Boutron (TV series)
 2000 Under Suspicion directed by Stephen Hopkins 
 2012 L'Été des Lip directed by Dominique Ladoge (TV)

Actor
 1983 : Le Marginal, directed by Jacques Deray
 1985 : Billy Ze Kick, directed by Gérard Mordillat
 1986 : Série Noire, (episode La nuit du flingueur directed by Pierre Grimblat) (TV series)

Novels
 À bulletins rouges, 1973
 Billy-Ze-Kick, 1974 - Novel adapted by Gérard Mordillat 1985
 Mister Love, 1977
 Typhon gazoline, 1977
 Le Mensonge - Chronique des années de crise, 1978
 Bloody-Mary, 1979 
 Groom, 1981 
 Canicule, 1982 - Novel adapted by Yves Boisset 1984
 La Vie Ripolin, 1987
 Un grand pas vers le bon Dieu, 1989 Prix Goncourt
 Symphonie Grabuge, 1994 Prix du roman populiste
 Le Roi des ordures, 1997
 Un monsieur bien mis, 1987
 Le Cri du peuple, 1998 Prix Louis-Guilloux in 1999. Adapted as a graphic novel in four books by Jacques Tardi in 2005.
 L’homme qui assassinait sa vie, 2001
 Le Journal de Louise B., 2002

Four French Soldiers 
 Adieu la vie, adieu l’amour, 2004   [vol 1]
 La Femme au gant rouge, 2004  [vol 2]
 La grande zigouille, 2009  [vol 3]
 Les années Faribole, 2012 [vol 4]

Novellas
 1983 : Patchwork, Prix des Deux Magots 1984
 1986 : Baby-boom, Prix Goncourt de la Nouvelle 1986
 1989 : Dix-huit tentatives pour devenir un saint
 1992 : Courage chacun
 2005 : Si on s’aimait ?
 2009 : Maîtresse Kristal et autres bris de guerre

Collaboration
Les Aventures de Boro, reporter photographe, with Dan Franck
 La Dame de Berlin, 1987 - Novel adapted by Pierre Boutron 1991
 Le Temps des cerises, 1990
 Les Noces de Guernica, 1994
 Mademoiselle Chat, 1996
 Boro s’en va-t-en guerre, 2000
 Cher Boro,  2005
 La Fête à Boro, 2007
 La Dame de Jérusalem, 2009

References

External links
 

People from Meurthe-et-Moselle
1933 births
2015 deaths
Prix Goncourt winners
Prix Goncourt de la nouvelle recipients
Prix Goncourt des lycéens winners
Prix des Deux Magots winners
Prix Louis Guilloux winners
French historical novelists
French male short story writers
French short story writers
French crime fiction writers
French film directors
French male screenwriters
French screenwriters
French film critics
20th-century French novelists
21st-century French novelists
French male novelists
20th-century French male writers
21st-century French male writers
French male non-fiction writers